Einars Gņedojs (8 July 1965 – 9 November 2022) was a Soviet and Latvian footballer who played as a defender.

References

1965 births
2022 deaths
Soviet footballers
Latvian footballers
Association football defenders
Latvia international footballers
FK Liepājas Metalurgs players
Skonto FC players
FK Jelgava players
Latvian expatriate footballers
Latvian expatriate sportspeople in Estonia
Expatriate footballers in Estonia